USS San Juan (SSN-751), a , is the third ship of the United States Navy to be named San Juan, though only the second named for San Juan, Puerto Rico. The contract to build her was awarded to the Electric Boat Division of General Dynamics Corporation in Groton, Connecticut on 30 November 1982 and her keel was laid down on 9 August 1985.  She was launched on 6 December 1986 sponsored by Mrs. Sherrill Hernandez, wife of VADM Diego E. Hernández, and commissioned on 6 August 1988.

During the early evening of 13 March 2007, units of the USS Enterprise Carrier Strike Group (CSG) received a series of indications that USS San Juan (SSN-751), a Los Angeles-class submarine conducting pre-deployment training with the Enterprise CSG, was in distress.

The submarine established communications in the early morning hours of 14 March, and indicated that there were no problems; hence, units were able to stand down from the search and rescue that was already well underway.

History
San Juan was the first of the Flight III or 688i for "improved" design, that received a number of significant improvements to the previous boats in the class. San Juan and all subsequent boats in her class are quieter and incorporate an advanced AN/BSY-1 sonar suite combat system. Another improvement includes the ability to lay mines from their torpedo tubes. San Juans sail was also strengthened, enabling the ability to break through ice.

First 688i through-ice surfacing 

In 1993 San Juan conducted the first through-ice surfacing for a 688i-class submarine in the Arctic.

Collision with USS Kentucky

On 19 March 1998 off the coast of Long Island, New York, the submerged San Juan collided with the surfaced fleet ballistic missile submarine . There were no injuries reported as a result of the collision.

Lost communication 

On 13 March 2007, San Juan was the subject of a search and rescue mission by the carrier  and elements of her Carrier Strike Group off the coast of Florida, when contact with the submarine was lost, and a red flare was spotted in her projected vicinity, suggesting an emergency. Communications were re-established early the next day when San Juan surfaced, and no problems were indicated.

Visit to South Africa

On 4 November 2009 San Juan arrived at Simon's Town, South Africa. The ship engaged in at-sea maneuvers with the South African Navy for the first time in U.S. history.

2010 overhaul

San Juan arrived at Portsmouth Naval Shipyard (PNSY), Maine, on 8 April 2010 for an engineered overhaul (EOH); for maintenance and system upgrades.

As of 2012 San Juan was assigned to Submarine Group Two. Submarine Group Two was disestablished in 2014, and San Juan became part of Submarine Force, U.S. Atlantic Fleet (COMSUBLANT).

Awards 
 Battle E – 30 September 1991
 Battle E – 30 September 1992
 Battle E – 30 September 1994
 Navy Unit Commendation – 1 July 1994
 Meritorious Unit Commendation – 1 July 1997
 Meritorious Unit Commendation – 10 December 1998
 Battle E – 31 December 2002
 Armed Forces Expeditionary Medal – 31 March 2003
 Meritorious Unit Commendation – 5 October 2005
 Meritorious Unit Commendation – 22 November 2009
 Battle E – 8 January 2010
Battle Effectiveness Award – 12 January 2017

References

External links

 USS San Juan Homepage
 

 

Ships built in Groton, Connecticut
Los Angeles-class submarines
Cold War submarines of the United States
Nuclear submarines of the United States Navy
United States submarine accidents
Maritime incidents in 1998
1986 ships
Submarines of the United States